Way of life may refer to:

Lifestyle (sociology), a term to describe the way a person lives
 Modus vivendi, a Latin phrase meaning way of life or way of living 
 The culture of a nation or tribe

Books
A Way of Life: Over Thirty Years of Blood, Sweat and Tears, autobiography by Reginald Kray
A Way of Life, Like Any Other, novel by Darcy O'Brien 1977
The Way to Life, a 1981 novel by Benjamin Hoff

Film
A Way of Life (2004 film), a 2004 British film
A Way of Life (2016 film), a 2016 American short film

Music

Albums
A Way of Life (The Family Dogg album), a 1969 album by The Family Dogg
A Way of Life (Suicide album), a 1988 album by Suicide
 Way of Life (album), a 2010 album by Jimmy Cozier
One Way of Life, a 1998 album by The Levellers

Songs
A Way of Life (song), a song from the album of the same name
 "Way of Life" (Lil Wayne song), 2002
 "Way of Life" (Slinkee Minx song), 2007
 Way of Life, a song by Gentle Giant from the 1973 album In a Glass House

See also

 Lifestyle (disambiguation)
 Way (disambiguation)
 Life (disambiguation)